Saint-Laurent station is a Montreal Metro station in the borough of Ville-Marie in Montreal, Quebec, Canada. It is operated by the Société de transport de Montréal (STM) and serves the Green Line. The station opened on October 14, 1966, as part of the original network of the Metro.

Overview
Designed by Brassard et Warren, it is a normal side platform station, built in an open cut under boul. de Maisonneuve. The station's volume contains its mezzanine and ticket hall, connected to a single entrance. This is one of the few downtown stations not to have an entrance integrated into another building, and plans for the vacant lot around the station continually surface; the current plan is for a cultural centre, including a school of contemporary dance.

Architecture and art
The station contains non-figurative tiled murals by noted ceramicist Claude Vermette.

Origin of the name
The station takes its name from Saint Laurent Boulevard (in French, boulevard Saint-Laurent), a main thoroughfare of Montreal, opened and named by 1720 as the road joining Montreal to the village of Côte-Saint-Laurent, now a borough of Montreal. The latter was named for Saint Lawrence, probably by allusion to the Saint Lawrence River. Saint Laurent Boulevard is considered the dividing line between eastern and western Montreal, and divides addresses between east and west.

Connecting bus routes

Nearby points of interest
 UQAM
 Saint Laurent Boulevard
 Pavillon Ste-Catherine
 Ex-Centris
 Just for Laughs Museum
 Canadian Centre for International Studies and Cooperation (CECI)

References

External links

Saint-Laurent Station - official site
Montreal by Metro, metrodemontreal.com - photos, information, and trivia
 2011 STM System Map
 2011 Downtown System Map
 Metro Map

Green Line (Montreal Metro)
Railway stations in Canada opened in 1966
Quartier des spectacles